Pickletillem or Pickletillum is a hamlet situated in Fife, Scotland. The village is located on the A914 south of the junction with the A92.

Overview and history
Pickletillum is a small hamlet which had an inn and has a few houses.

The Pickletillum Inn, a coaching inn dating from 1732, was demolished in 2018 after standing unoccupied and dilapidated for years. Planning permission was granted by Fife County Council in 2015 for 8 2-bedroom flats to be built on the site by Kingdom Housing Association and these are due for occupation in January 2021.

Governance
Fife Council is the unitary local authority for Pickletillum.

The village is in the North East Fife constituency of the Parliament of the United Kingdom.

For the purposes of the Scottish Parliament, Pickletillum forms part of the North East Fife constituency.

References

External links
 Pickletillem at Fife Place-name Data

Villages in Fife